Buenos Aires Vice Versa is a 1996 Argentine and  Dutch dramatic film, written and directed by Alejandro Agresti. The film was produced by Alejandro Agresti and Axel Harding, and co-produced by Emjay Rechsteiner.

The picture deals with the alienation felt by the children who survived the Argentine military dictatorship of the 1970s.

Plot
Opening Title Graphic:As the film begins a message appears and reminds the audience that approximately 30,000 people died during the Dirty War due to the military dictatorship's reign during the late 1970s and early 1980s.

The story is then dedicated to the surviving children of the dictatorship's victims. Two such children, now adults, are the main characters. One, Daniela (Vera Fogwill), now has her degree in film and is having trouble finding work. She's hired by an older couple who are living in seclusion, to film Buenos Aires for them so they can see it again. So she goes out and documents the city. But her customers are upset, as they don't remember the Buenos Aires Daniela has filmed.  She then shoots a reel of tourist-type shots in hopes of pleasing the couple. The other surviving child, Damián, played by Nicolás Pauls, works in a low-rent motel. He eventually discovers the truth about what his parents experienced during the dictatorship.

The story is largely episodic, blending together more than 6 different story lines.

Cast
 Vera Fogwill as Daniela
 Nicolás Pauls as Damián
 Fernán Mirás as Mario
 Mirta Busnelli as Loca TV
 Carlos Roffé as Service
 Mario Paolucci as Amigo
 Laura Melillo as Ciega
 Harry Havilio as Tío
 Nazareno Casero as Bocha
 Carlos Galettini as Don Nicolás
 Floria Bloise as Doña Amalia
 Inés Molina as Chica

Background

The film is based on the aftermath of the real political events that took place in Argentina after Jorge Rafael Videla's reactionary military junta assumed power on March 24, 1976.  During the junta's rule: the parliament was suspended; unions, political parties and provincial governments were banned, and in what became known as the Dirty War, between 9,000 and 30,000 people who were considered left-wing "subversives" disappeared from society.

Distribution

The film was first presented at the Mar del Plata Film Festival in  November 1996. It opened wide in Argentina on September 18, 1997.

The film was screened at various film festivals, including: the 1996 Cannes Film Festival, France; the Contemporary Latin American Film Series at UCLA, Los Angeles; the Oslo Film Festival, Norway; the Havana Film Festival, Cuba; and others.

Critical reception
Film critic Karen Jaehne praised the film, and wrote, "The film tells you enough about each character to evoke our sympathy and not enough to let us see any possible resolution of the dilemma of loneliness. It's an intelligent film that observes mannerisms and social behavior in a way that makes you nod and say, "Yes, that's how it is." It builds toward a very powerful ending that reminds us of many another urban disaster story, but the problem that has made Buenos Aires a metropolitan orphanage is undeniable. Buenos Aires - Vice Versa is a wise film - worth watching and will undoubtedly make it to a festival near you."

Awards
Wins
 Mar del Plata Film Festival: Best Ibero-American Film, Alejandro Agresti; FIPRESCI Prize, Alejandro Agresti; OCIC Award - Honorable Mention, Alejandro Agresti; 1996.
 Havana Film Festival: Special Jury Prize, Alejandro Agresti; 1996.
 Argentine Film Critics Association Awards: Silver Condor; Best Editing, Alejandro Agresti, Alejandro Brodersohn; Best Film; Best New Actress, Vera Fogwill; Best Original Screenplay, Alejandro Agresti; 1998.

Nominations
 Netherlands Film Festival: Golden Calf, Best Director of a Feature Film, Alejandro Agresti; 1997.
 Argentine Film Critics Association Awards: Silver Condor, Best Director, Alejandro Agresti; Best New Acto, Nazareno Casero; Best New Actor), Nicolás Pauls; Best Supporting Actor, Carlos Roffé; Best Supporting Actress, Mirta Busnelli; 1998.

References

External links
 
 Buenos Aires viceversa at cinenacional.com 
 Buenos Aires viceversa film review at Cineismo by Guillermo Ravaschino 
  film clip

1996 films
1996 drama films
Argentine independent films
Dutch independent films
Dirty War films
Films about Latin American military dictatorships
Films directed by Alejandro Agresti
Films set in Buenos Aires
Films shot in Buenos Aires
Political drama films
1990s Spanish-language films
1997 drama films
1997 films